There have been two baronetcies created for persons with the surname Fuller, one in the Baronetage of England and one in the Baronetage of the United Kingdom. One creation is extant as of 2010.

The Fuller Baronetcy, of the Inner Temple, was created in the Baronetage of England on 1 August 1687 for James Chapman Fuller. The title became extinct on his death in 1709.

The Fuller Baronetcy, of Neston Park in Corsham, in the County of Wiltshire, was created in the Baronetage of the United Kingdom on 7 July 1910 for John Fuller. He represented Westbury in the House of Commons as a Liberal from 1900 to 1911 and served as Governor of Victoria from 1911 to 1914.

Fuller baronets, of the Inner Temple (1687)
Sir James Chapman Fuller, 1st Baronet (died 1709)

Fuller baronets, of Neston Park (1910)
Sir John Michael Fleetwood Fuller, 1st Baronet (1864–1915)
Sir (John) Gerard Henry Fleetwood Fuller, 2nd Baronet (1906–1981), born 8 July 1906, son of 1st Baronet and Norah Jacintha Phipps, daughter of Charles Nicholas Paul Phipps of Chalcot House, near Westbury, Wiltshire; served Life Guards, 1927 to 1946; Second World War (mentioned in despatches); Justice of the Peace for Wiltshire, 1946; Member of Wiltshire County Council, 1947–1971 (alderman, 1961); Joint Master, Avon Vale Fox Hounds, 1947–1961 and 1962–1964. Married 1931, Lady Fiona Pratt, daughter of 4th Marquess Camden GCVO (divorced 1944), two sons; secondly, 1945, Kathleen Elizabeth MBE DStJ (died 1964), daughter of Sir George Farrar, Bt; and thirdly, 1966, Mrs Mary Leventon; he died 16 October 1981.
Sir John William Fleetwood Fuller, 3rd Baronet (1936–1998)
Sir James Henry Fleetwood Fuller, 4th Baronet (born 1970)

See also
Fuller-Eliott-Drake baronets
Fuller-Acland-Hood baronets of St Audries

Notes

References 
Kidd, Charles, Williamson, David (editors). Debrett's Peerage and Baronetage (1990 edition). New York: St Martin's Press, 1990, 

Baronetcies in the Baronetage of the United Kingdom
People from Corsham
Extinct baronetcies in the Baronetage of England